Michael Wimmer (born 18 June 1980) is a German football coach, who last managed VfB Stuttgart.

Career
In the summer of 2019 he became assistant coach of VfB Stuttgart. On 11 October 2022, Wimmer took over as head coach of VfB Stuttgart on interim basis until December 2022.

References

1980 births
Living people
German football managers
Bundesliga managers
VfB Stuttgart managers
SpVgg Greuther Fürth II players
Footballers from Bavaria
FK Austria Wien managers